Hajibaba Huseynali oghlu Huseynov (March 15, 1919 – October 24, 1993) was an Azerbaijani khananda, poet, pedagogue. He was awarded the People's Artists of the Azerbaijan SSR.

Biography 
Hajibaba Huseynov was born on March 15, 1919, in Baku. With the outbreak of the Great Patriotic War in 1941, he began to work as a lathe operator at the "Parkommuna" plant. After the end of the war in 1945, the famous singer Sara Gadimova, the sister-in-law of him, introduced Hajibaba Huseynov to the prominent pedagogue, tar player Ahmad Bakikhanov. A. Bakikhanov invited H. Huseynov to his ensemble and he worked there for three years.

In 1962–1992, Hajibaba Huseynov taught mugham at Azerbaijan State Music School named after Asaf Zeynally. Nazakat Mammadova, Gadir Rustamov, Sakhavat Mammadov, Zaur Rzayev, Teymur Mustafayev, Sabir Aliyev, Bilal Aliyev, Zabit Nabizade and others were his students.

Hajibaba Huseynov was the first performer of "Ushshag", "Husseini", "Novruzi ravanda" sections of Rast mugham and "Shah Khatai" section of other mughams. At his initiative, the "Dilruba" section of Bayaty-Shiraz mugham was added to the textbook.

The singer had started touring abroad since 1989. His first visit was to Iraq with a great musician staff. He gave concerts in Turkey (Adana) in 1990 and in Belgium (Brussels), France (Paris, Marseille, Lyon, Montpellier), Switzerland and the Netherlands for one month in 1991. His last visit was to the Islamic Republic of Iran in 1992, which lasted more than two months with a group of twelve musicians.

H. Huseynov died on October 24, 1993, in Baku. By the order of Heydar Aliyev, the singer was buried on October 26, 1993, in the First Alley of Honor.

On February 22, 2019, President Ilham Aliyev signed an order to celebrate the 100th anniversary of Hajibaba Huseynov.

Awards 
 People's Artist of the Azerbaijan SSR — October 29, 1990
 Honored Artist of the Azerbaijan SSR — March 21, 1989

References

Literature 
 
 

1919 births
1993 deaths
20th-century Azerbaijani male singers
Azerbaijani educators
Mugham singers
Musicians from Baku
People's Artists of the Azerbaijan SSR